50 Moganshan Road or "M50" is a contemporary art district in Shanghai, China, that houses a community of more than a hundred artists whose studios are open to the public. It is often compared with New York's SoHo and Beijing's 798 Art Zone.  The art quarter has become a popular cultural attraction for local and international visitors alike, and was named among the top ten things to do in Shanghai by Time Magazine.

Location
The name refers to its actual address in Shanghai, and is often shortened to M50 or Moganshan Road.  It is tucked away in an old industrial area along the Suzhou Creek.  The art quarter is located in industrial and residential Putuo District, but conveniently close to downtown Jing'an District.

History
50 Moganshan Road was once the Chunming Slub Mill.  The art scene was started in 2000 by local artist Xue Song who was initially attracted by the cheap rent of the disused industrial space. Other artists including Ding Yi, Qu Fengguo, and Wang Xingwei, soon followed.  Today the quarter's former factories and warehouses have been converted into art galleries, artists’ studios, design agencies and other visual art and cultural businesses of various sizes.  The land and buildings are still owned by Shangtex, the state-owned textile group that operated the now defunct factory.

Artists and galleries
M50 hosts over 120 galleries and art studios.  Some of Shanghai's best known artists work here, including Zhou Tiehai, Ding Yi, Yelan,  and the media art collective Liu Dao. Galleries include ShanghART Gallery, EastLink Gallery, island6, Pantocrator Gallery, and Biz Art.

Transportation
The closest Shanghai Metro station in the vicinity of M50 is Jiangning Road Station (on Line 13), followed by Zhongtan Road Station (on Line 3 and Line 4).

Gallery

See also
 Museum of Contemporary Art Shanghai
 Shanghai Museum
 Yuz Museum Shanghai
 Power Station of Art
 Rockbund Art Museum
 The Bund Finance Center
 Long Museum
 China Art Museum
 Tianzifang
 West Bund Art & Design
 798 Art Zone

References

External links
 88 MOCCA – Museum of Chinese Contemporary Art
 Art Scene China
 SHANGHART – largest gallery of the m50 Art District
 island6 Arts Center – artist-founded art space with a production site and an adjoining gallery
 YelanArt

2000 establishments in China
Tourist attractions in Shanghai
Culture in Shanghai
Arts districts
Chinese art
Putuo District, Shanghai